Qualification rounds of Women's 100 metre backstroke at the 1958 European Aquatics Championships were held on 2 September. The final was held the next day. There were 19 participants in the competition.

Results

Qualifications

Final

Sources

1958 in sports